Khawar Rizvi (1 June 1938 – 15 November 1981) was a poet and scholar of Urdu and Persian. His real name was Syed Sibte Hassan Rizvi. Rizvi adopted "Khawar," meaning "the east" in Persian, as a pen-name for writing poetry and essays. Rizvi was a great lover and admirer of east, eastern way of life and eastern values.

Early life and career
Khawar Rizvi belonged to a noble Syed family. He was born on 1 June 1938. Some sources claim that his actual year of birth was 1936 but the official documents show that he was born in 1938.  He inherited poetry from his mother Abida Begum who herself was a poet of high caliber though most of her poetry could not be preserved. His maternal uncle Dr Abul Hassan was a well-known poet and scholar.  Bano Saidpuri, an eminent poet, was his aunt. The father of Khawar Rizvi, Syed Najm ul Hassan Rizvi, belonged to armed forces of Pakistan. He fully supported and encouraged his son to become a great man.

Rizvi was fond of knowledge and learning since his early childhood. He received his formal education at Government School, Campbell Pur, now called Attock. He graduated from Government College Attock. Afterwards he undertook post-graduate studies in literature at the University of Punjab. He started his career as a teacher then he joined banking sector and became a competent banker. Due to his abhorrence for any sort of exploitation and depriving the poor from their rights he left banking career despite an uncertain future ahead of him. To serve people better, Khawar joined the department of social security in Pakistan. He was serving in the same department as a director when he died of sudden heart attack on 15 November 1981 while journeying from his home town to his work place. His funeral was attended by thousands of people and he was buried in the graveyard of Ahmad Pur Sial, a historical small town in Jhang District, Pakistan. His death at the age of 43 was widely mourned throughout the continent, especially in the region of South Asia.

Ideology and activism
Rizvi belonged to the Progressive Writers' Movement in the sub-continent of India and Pakistan. Khawar was against all sorts and types of tyranny, dictatorship, subjugation and exploitation. Due to his ideology and political beliefs he became the victim of the policies then-Pakistani dictator General Zia-ul-Haq. Rizvi fought for the freedom of expression, civil liberties, human rights, equality and alleviation of poverty.

Tributes and homages

The progressive poetry of Rizvi was ever acknowledged and appreciated during his lifetime and after his death. Writers and poets like Ahmad Nadeem Qasimi, Tanveer Sipra, Professor Yousuf Hassan, Amjad Islam Amjad, Munno Bhai, Hassan Akhter Jalil and others condoled his death. Ahmad Nadeem Qasimi wrote for him in his literary magazine "Funnon" published from Lahore. Khalid Ahmad wrote a long article about Khawar's poetry and personality published in "daily Jang" Karachi. Hassan Rizvi published a piece of article about him in daily "Jang" Lahore. Azhar Javed wrote about him in his magazine "Takhleeq". The magazine of Government College Attock "Mashal" dedicated a special section for Khawar Rizvi  and his poetry. Poets like Iqbal Kausar and Dr Saad ullah Kaleem, Professor Zafar Jaunpri, Saeed Jaunpuri and others also wrote the appreciation of Khawar's poetry. The names and works of Khawar Rizvi  and his son Dr Syed Shabih-ul-Hassan Rizvi were mentioned in the books of Rashid Amjad, Raghab Shakeeb, Waqar bin Ellahi and in other books and periodicals. A popular, unique and widely circulated magazine Kidzine International paid tribute to Khawar Rizvi in following words:
He was ever respected as a thinker and scholar throughout his life though it was so short in years but too big in deeds. Khawar Rizvi’s thought was progressive. He never compromised on any subjugation. Though he was at high position in Social Security department yet he always defended the rights of the workers. All his life he loved youth and children. He never liked disappointment and negative thinking. He was too full of life that death didn’t dare to enter his home but caught him in the middle of way far from his home in the morning and mourning hours of 15th November 1981 when he was only 43. After so many years of his death he still lives in the hearts and the memories of those who love his personality and his poetry.

Further reading 
 Khawar Rizvi, The Poet of Hope, Kidzine International, November 2009, ed Farwa Hassan

References

External links
 Syed Khawar Rizvi
 Syed Khawar Rizvi poetry at Rekhta

1938 births
1981 deaths
Urdu-language poets from Pakistan